John M.P. Marks (born 9 December 1952) is a former professional tennis player from Australia.

Marks is best remembered for finishing runner-up in singles at the 1978 Australian Open, defeating Arthur Ashe in the semifinals. As a result of this slam final appearance, he achieved his career-high singles ranking of world No. 44, after entering the tournament ranked No. 177. Marks never won a singles title during his career, but won 7 doubles titles and reached the semifinals of the men's doubles at the 1978 US Open. As a junior, Marks won the Australian Open boys' doubles in 1971, partnering Michael Phillips.

Career finals

Singles (2 runners-up )

Doubles (7 titles, 7 runner-ups)

Grand Slam tournament performance timeline

Singles

Note: The Australian Open was held twice in 1977, in January and December.

References

External links
 
 

1952 births
Living people
Australian male tennis players
Australian Open (tennis) junior champions
Sportsmen from New South Wales
Tennis players from Sydney
Australian Institute of Sport coaches
Universiade medalists in tennis
Universiade bronze medalists for Australia
Grand Slam (tennis) champions in boys' doubles
Medalists at the 1973 Summer Universiade